Chuan He is a Chinese-American chemical biologist. He currently serves as the John T. Wilson Distinguished Service Professor at the University of Chicago, and an Investigator of the Howard Hughes Medical Institute. He is best known for his work in discovering and deciphering reversible RNA methylation in post-transcriptional gene expression regulation.

Education
He graduated from the University of Science and Technology of China in 1994 with a Bachelor of Science in Chemistry. After undergoing his Ph.D. training with Stephen J. Lippard at the Massachusetts Institute of Technology, he worked under Gregory L. Verdine as a Damon Runyon Postdoctoral Fellow at Harvard University. He subsequently became a faculty member in the Department of Chemistry at the University of Chicago in 2002.

Research
In 2010, He proposed that RNA modifications could be reversible and may have regulatory roles. He and colleagues subsequently discovered the first RNA demethylase that oxidatively reverses N6-methyladenosine (m6A) methylation in mammalian messenger RNA (mRNA) in 2011. The existence of m6A in mRNA was discovered in 1974 in both eukaryotic and viral mRNAs; however, the biological significance and functional role were not known before He’s work. This methylation is the most abundant internal modification in mammalian mRNA. In 2012, two independent studies reported transcriptome-wide mapping of m6A in mammalian cells and tissues, revealing a unique distribution pattern. He and co-workers identified and characterized the direct reader proteins for m6A, which impact the stability and the translation efficiency of m6A-modified mRNA, elucidating functional roles of mRNA methylation. His group also purified the methyltransferase complex that mediates this methylation.

The He laboratory also studies DNA methylation. He invented TAB-seq, a method that can map 5-hydroxymethylcytosine (5hmC) at base-resolution genome-wide, as well as hmC-Seal, a method that covalently labels 5hmC for its detection and profiling. Together with two other research groups, He and co-workers have revealed the DNA N6-methyldeoxyadenosine as a new methylation mark that could affect gene expression in eukaryotes.

Honors and awards
 2003: Searle Scholar Award 
 2005: Beckman Young Investigators Award
 2017: Paul Marks Prize for Cancer Research
 2019: ACS Chemical Biology Lectureship
 2023: Wolf Prize in Chemistry

References

External links
 He Lab at The University of Chicago

1972 births
Living people
21st-century American biochemists
American biochemists
American geneticists
Biologists from Guizhou
Chemists from Guizhou
Chinese emigrants to the United States
Educators from Guizhou
Harvard University faculty
Howard Hughes Medical Investigators
Massachusetts Institute of Technology alumni
University of Chicago faculty
University of Science and Technology of China alumni